Lucien Pedro Lodevicus Dirksz (born 29 September 1968) is an Aruban former cyclist. He competed at the 1992 Summer Olympics and the 1996 Summer Olympics.  During the 1992 Summer Olympics opening ceremony Dirksz was the flag bearer for Aruba.

References

External links
 

1968 births
Living people
Aruban male cyclists
Olympic cyclists of Aruba
Cyclists at the 1992 Summer Olympics
Cyclists at the 1996 Summer Olympics
Place of birth missing (living people)